Lori Strong (born 12 September 1972) is a Canadian former artistic gymnast who represented her country at the 1988 and 1992 Summer Olympics. She is the 1990 Commonwealth Games all around, floor exercise, and beam champion. In 2000, she became a gymnastics sports commentator at the Canadian Broadcasting Corporation, covering the Olympic games.

Eponymous skill
Strong has an eponymous uneven bars skill listed in the Code of Points, a transition from high to low bar with one and a half twists.

References 

Canadian female artistic gymnasts
Commonwealth Games gold medallists for Canada
Commonwealth Games silver medallists for Canada
Gymnasts at the 1990 Commonwealth Games
Gymnasts at the 1988 Summer Olympics
Olympic gymnasts of Canada
Gymnasts at the 1992 Summer Olympics
Commonwealth Games medallists in gymnastics
Living people
1972 births
Originators of elements in artistic gymnastics
Georgia Gym Dogs gymnasts
Medallists at the 1990 Commonwealth Games